Cheb Balowski is a Spanish musical group of ten singers in Spanish, Catalan, and Arabic. They formed in Barcelona, 2000.

Discography 
Bartzeloona (2001)
Potiner (2003)
Plou Plom (Musiqueta que enamora) (2005)

Spanish musical groups